This is a list of airports in the Campbell River area of British Columbia, Canada:

See also

 List of airports in the Gulf Islands
 List of airports in the Lower Mainland
 List of airports in the Okanagan
 List of airports in the Prince Rupert area
 List of airports on Vancouver Island
 List of airports in Greater Victoria

References

 
Campbell River, British Columbia